Tommy Jones may refer to:

 Tommy Jones (defensive back) (born 1971), American football player
 Tommy Jones (quarterback) (born 1979), American and Canadian football quarterback
 Tommy Jones (baseball) (Thomas M. Jones, 1954–2009), American baseball player, manager, coach and executive
 Tommy Jones (bowler) (born 1978), American professional bowler
 Tommy Jones (footballer, born 1907) (Thomas William Jones, 1907–1980), English footballer who played for Burnley, Blackpool and Grimsby Town
 Tommy Jones (footballer, born 1909) (Thomas John Jones, 1909–?), Welsh international footballer who played for Tranmere Rovers, Sheffield Wednesday, Manchester United and Watford
 Tommy Jones (footballer, born 1930) (1930–2010), football centre half who played for Everton in the 1940s and 1950s
 Tommy Lee Jones (born 1946), American film actor

See also
 Thomas Jones (disambiguation)
 Tom Jones (disambiguation)